Events from the year 1959 in Pakistan.

Incumbents

Federal government
President: Ayub Khan
Chief Justice: Muhammad Munir

Events

October
26 October,  Ayub Khan announces his system of 80,000 Basic Democrats, who would further form the electoral college for the elections of the President and the members of the Central and Provisional Legislature.

December
First step of elections to the Basic Democrat units in both parts of the country.

See also
 1958 in Pakistan
 Other events of 1959
 1960 in Pakistan
 List of Pakistani films of 1959
 Timeline of Pakistani history

 
1959 in Asia